High on a Happy Vibe is the debut album by British Eurodance band Urban Cookie Collective, released in 1994. The album includes the singles "The Key, the Secret" (UK No. 2), "Feels Like Heaven" (UK No. 5), "Sail Away" (UK No. 18), "High on a Happy Vibe" (UK No. 31) and "Bring It on Home (Family)" (UK No. 56).

Track listing
All tracks written by Rohan Heath, except where noted.	
"The Key, the Secret" (Elvio Moratto)
"Feels Like Heaven"
"Walk Right On"
"Yours Is the Love"
"Dreaming in Colours"
"Sail Away"
"World Wide Reunion"
"Bring It on Home (Family)"
"Hidden Land"
"High on a Happy Vibe"
"The Key, the Secret" (Kamoflage Club Mix) (Elvio Moratto)
"Sail Away" (Judge Jules & Michael Skins Vocal Pop Funk Mix)

Personnel
Adapted from AllMusic.
Charlemagne – vocals
Andrew Greasly – engineer
Rohan Heath – producer
Judge Jules – producer, remixing
Lee Monteverde – engineer
Michael Skins – producer, remixing
Urban Cookie Collective – primary artist

Charts

References

External links
High on a Happy Vibe at Discogs

1994 debut albums
Urban Cookie Collective albums